Xinghua High School (兴化中学) was founded in 1926 and its original name was "Xinghua County Junior High School (兴化县立初级中学)". The school is located in the original site of Wenzheng College (文正学院). The school had employed well-trained teachers to teach student, which made it become well known as the Kuan Xing Wui (群英会). After the Anti-Japanese War, the school moved to a temple in Xinghua city.  After the New China was founded in 1952, the Jiangsu Civil Administration decided to name the school Jiangsu Xinghua School (苏北兴化中学). In 1953, it was renamed Xinghua High School, Jiangsu Province and became one of the provincial first-class high schools. In 1980, the provincial government claimed the school as a member of the province's first government run schools. In 1994, it was accepted as one of the provincial key high schools. In 2004, Jiangsu Province, it received the first four-star high school acceptance in Jiangsu province.

History 
The school history can be traced back to the Qing Dynasty when it was 1834. And at that time, the school was called "Wengzhen Academy". In 1953, the government of Jiangsu province authorized the school to rename as "Xinghua Middle School". In 1980, it was awarded the reputation of "Four-star level high school".

The scale of the school 
The school has covered an area of 200 acres. The floor area of the construction buildings is about 50,000m2 and the green area is about 53,000m2. The region of construction is relatively and rational concentrated, including teaching buildings, the gymnasium, the student apartments, the dining halls etc. A group of modern building groups stand among those constructions, for instance: a bridge in 120m length called Jing Fan Bridge to show admiration to Fan Zhongyan crosses the eastern and the western part of the campus. A variety of natural and cultural landscapes exist.

The teacher resources 
There are fifty-four high-level classes in the school now. The number of the students is more than 2,800 and the number of the faculties is more than 220. The teachers in the school all have a bachelor degree or above. There are three special grade teachers, one well-known provincial grade teacher, eighty-seven senior teachers and sixty-nine secondary teachers in the school now.

The famous people in the school 
Xinghua High School is a famous school with civilization cultural heritage and revolutionary tradition and is also a dynamic modern school. The schoolfellows appear everywhere and talents are well known in the whole world. There are four alumni have been voted as committees of the Chinese Academy of Sciences and the headmaster of Academy of Sciences. There are many famous schoolfellows, including Jingyi Niu, YaJie Zhu, Chunfen Li, Wei Ren, Deping Li,  Tonggong Yuan,  Shaowu Chen,  ZuQi Fang,  Yan Zhang and so on.

School slogans
School Motto: Honesty and Sincerity
School Spirit: Diligence, Thinking, Realistic, Discipline

References 

http://www.xhedu.com/
https://web.archive.org/web/20120425051236/http://www.tznews.cn/Article/jiaoyu/xiaoyzt/200705/191.html

High schools in Jiangsu
Educational institutions established in 1926
1926 establishments in China
Taizhou, Jiangsu